Samuel Hernández is a Puerto Rican Christian music singer. He also has had songs crossover and become mainstream secular hits. His 2003 album Jesús siempre llega a tiempo was one of the first big-selling Puerto Rican Christian albums. He performed in the José Miguel Agrelot Coliseum with Marcos Witt in 2009. His best known song is "Levanto mis manos", which ranked # 32 on the Billboard Latin Pop Airplay chart.

He was nominated at Latin Grammy Award as Best Christian Album in 2004.

Biography 
Samuel Hernández Vega was born in Caguas, Puerto Rico. His first production was Un Sueño Hecho Realidad ("A dream come true"), released in 1993. Later, he graduated in Accounting and Marketing in Ana G. Méndez University, with excellent grades, and began to practice his profession, however, a car accident changes the course of his life.

Samuel expressed that he received the direct call to sing and totally depend on God. After that event, he released his second album "Soy Una Nueva Vasija", which includes the song "De Lo Más Profundo".

His third album, "Faltan 5 Para Las 12: ¡Jesús Llegó!", became a gold record just a few months after its release in mid-2000. It was the only Christian production in Puerto Rico that it has managed to occupy, for 20 consecutive weeks, # 1 position on Christian radio stations with the title track. Two years later he releases "Jesus Siempre Llega a Tiempo", a continuation of his previous production.

After this, many very well received productions followed, which managed to enter Billboard charts, such as "Por Si No Hay Mañana", "Inyección de Fe" and the compilation "Éxitos".

"Me Conecta Al Cielo", Hernández's eighth album, contains the single "En Ti Lo Tengo Todo", with which he made his debut in the bachata genre.

In recent years, he released the albums "Duetos", "Gracias Señor En Vivo", and "Hay Poder En La Sangre de Jesús".

Discography

References

Living people
21st-century Puerto Rican male singers
20th-century Puerto Rican male singers
Performers of Christian music
1972 births